Estádio de São Miguel may mean:

 Estádio de São Miguel (Ponta Delgada), Portugal
 Estádio de São Miguel (Gondomar), Portugal